Ngan Phan-Koshnitsky (born Phan Huỳnh Băng Ngân; 24 February 1974) is a Vietnamese-Australian chess player holding the title of Woman International Master (WIM). She is now known as Ngan Nadalin.

Chess career 
Phan-Koshnitsky represented Vietnam in two Women's Chess Olympiads, in 1990 and 1992, and Australia in five Olympiads between 1996 and 2006.

She won the Australian Women's Championship in 1998. In the same year, she also competed in the Asian Women's Championship in the Genting Highlands, Malaysia, scoring 6/11.

Phan-Koshnitsky won the Oceania Women's Championship held on the Gold Coast, Queensland in April 2001. She went on to compete in the Women's World Chess Championship 2001 in Moscow, Russia, where she was eliminated in round 1 by Almira Skripchenko.

Phan-Koshnitsky was awarded by FIDE the titles of Woman FIDE Master (WFM) in 1995 and Woman International Master (WIM) in 2001.

Personal life
In the early 1990s, she married Peter Koshnitsky, son of former Australian chess champion Gary Koshnitsky. She remarried in 2007 and is now Ngan Nadalin.

References

External links

Ngan Phan Koshnitsky chess games at 365Chess.com

1974 births
Living people
Australian chess players
Chess Woman International Masters
Chess Olympiad competitors
Vietnamese emigrants to Australia